The Clock King is the name of three supervillains appearing in American comic books published by DC Comics. The first Clock King debuted in World's Finest Comics #111 (August 1960), and was created by France Herron and Lee Elias.

The Clock King made his first live-action appearance in the 1960s Batman series, portrayed by Walter Slezak. The character was later portrayed by Robert Knepper, appearing in episodes from the [[Arrow (season 2)|Arrows second season]] and The Flash set in the Arrowverse. The character, named Temple Fugate, also appears in shows set in the DC Animated Universe, voiced by Alan Rachins.

Publication history
The first Clock King was originally an enemy of Green Arrow. He has no superpowers or abilities. He wears a clock mask, a cape, and a blue suit with clock drawings on it.

Clock King is a master planner and sometimes uses clock-themed gadgetry. The Clock King became better known more recently by his appearances in Justice League International and Suicide Squad.

Fictional character biography
William Tockman
Born William Tockman, the Clock King spends his early years taking care of his invalid sister. During one day, he finds out from a doctor's visit that he himself only has six months to live. Despairing for his sister's future, he watches the timing of a local bank's vault to rob it, hoping the money would provide for his sister after he was gone. His caper would have gone successfully, had he not tripped a silent alarm and been caught by Green Arrow.

While he is incarcerated, his sister dies alone. In further and hideous irony, Tockman discovers that he really is not terminally ill; his doctor had accidentally switched his papers with those of another patient. Infuriated, he escapes, later futilely attempting revenge on both Green Arrow and the incompetent doctor.

With several other villains, the Clock King becomes a member of the Injustice League, a team of out-of-luck supervillains who, when banding together, become even less successful than they have been in their individual careers. The Injustice League is defeated time and again by the Justice League International, at least when they are not making laughingstocks of themselves. Trying to reform, the members later become the core of the equally laughable hero team Justice League Antarctica. This JLA includes G'Nort, who ends up saving the lives of the entire team. Like his compatriots, Clock King becomes an ardent supporter of Maxwell Lord, partly due to the fact he is the only one willing to hire them. His group even guards Lord when he is incapacitated by a bullet wound. The villains again later reunite as the Injustice League as henchmen of Sonar.

Later, the Clock King leads his own separate team of villains in a mission. They consist of Radiant, Sharpe, Acidia, and Crackle. They are not as well-organized as even the Injustice League. For example, Crackle still lives with his mother and they have to take the bus to their fight. It takes place at a Metropolis toy store. They end up fighting one of the many incarnations of the Teen Titans, the heroes Booster Gold and Firehawk and DEO agent Cameron Chase. An unclear super-effect from Chase ultimately neutralizes Clock King's team and they are all imprisoned. Clock King himself escapes on another bus.

Still later, Clock King and his Injustice League friends are transformed into the new Suicide Squad. They are sent to a remote research facility where a genetic monstrosity is holding its creator hostage. Its main defenses are spawned "children" that could explode. During the mission, most of the team are seemingly killed, including Clock King, who is shot repeatedly in a retreat attempt. He is seen still alive after his brutal wounds but, in the end, Major Disaster believes he is the only one who survives. It turns out Cluemaster, shot in a similar manner as Clock King, survives, albeit with drastic scarring. Multi-Man also survives due to his ability to be reborn with new powers after dying.

Clock King is not seen for a period of time after Infinite Crisis. In an issue of 52, one character decides to kill all the time-travelers, and mentions someone "ending up like Time Commander and Clock Queen".

Tem
A new Clock King appears in Teen Titans #56 as the head of a team of villains named the Terror Titans. In an interview with Teen Titans writer Sean McKeever, he described this Clock King as "... Very smart. He sees things differently than others". His costume is similar to the suit worn by the Clock King seen in Batman: The Animated Series, although lacking a hat and having clock faces on his tie. Also evocative of the Animated Series, Disruptor refers to him as "Tem" before being killed; After his group defeats and captures Kid Devil, Clock King conditions the hero to be sold as a fighter to a group called "The Dark Side Club". Clock King then brings the Titans to his base of operations, a dimension outside of time. After besting Robin, Clock King is stymied by Ravager, who possesses similar precognitive abilities. He offers Ravager a chance to join him, but she refuses. Clock King then removes the Titans from his base and decides to move on to new plans. Ravager ultimately reconsiders his earlier offer. In the Terror Titans miniseries, Clock King takes over the Dark Side Club, and uses it to brainwash young metahumans, turning them into his very own "Martyr Militia". He sends the Militia to attack Los Angeles, for no reason other than to amuse him. Clock King's plans are eventually undone by Miss Martian, who was posing as one of the captured Metahumans, and Ravager, who attacks and defeats him, forcing him to flee his base of operations.

The New 52
In The New 52, three iterations of the Clock King appeared:
 Billy Tockman is an African-American crime boss based in Seattle. Tockman owns a nightclub called the Midnight Lounge, and vintage clock repair shop called the Clock King, which he uses as a front for his operations. While Green Arrow is off dealing with The Outsiders, Diggle, along with Naomi Singh and Henry Fyff, talk Tockman into taking down Richard Dragon, to which he agrees. When they meet to take down Dragon, Tockman betrays them, claiming Dragon made a better offer. When Green Arrow returns and faces Dragon, he holds Naomi and Fyff at gunpoint on Dragon's orders and ends up shooting Fyff, then promptly getting beat up and knocked out by Emiko Queen.
 Another Clock King, wearing the original Clock King costume, battles the newest incarnation of the Birds of Prey amped up on Venom. 
 Another, bearing an appearance similar to his Animated Series look (but with a black and blue suit and black and yellow glasses), tries to rob a store alongside his roommate Sportsmaster, who calls him Bill. He is stopped by Harley Quinn and Power Girl, but not before teleporting them into another dimension. He is shown to have the ability to rewind time.

DC Rebirth
In the DC Rebirth relaunch, two Clock Kings are active:
 A man who wears the classic Clock King costume, but with his face showing, this new version claims to be a temporal anomaly and feeds on the life force of others to maintain his youth, which led to him preying on African citizens. He is sheltered within the African nation of Buredunia under dictator Matthew Bland. His actions drew the attention of Deathstroke, who was assigned by Bland to kill Clock King as revenge for his murders. However, Clock King managed to save his life by revealing that the warlord would kill Deathstroke after he had finished the job. He later kidnaps Bland. During the fight, Slade shoots him, revealing his powers to be special effects. Furthermore, Clock King revealed that as a time anomaly, he saw that as a result of Doctor Manhattan's manipulation of the timestream led to the rebirth of Deathstroke's ally Wintergreen. With that information, Deathstroke spared Clock King's life.
 A former engineer and drug dealer in a suit, sporting glasses inherited from his grandfather and having a tattoo of a clock and arrow on the side of his head, he wired targets to clocks that can kill the wearer. This version would later face Batman. He bragged that he would be able to predict every one of Batman's movements, but was defeated by a hiding Catwoman. He was invited to a weapons deal by Tiger Shark and Blockbuster on board a ship, which was stopped by Nightwing. He is seen tinkering with his clocks as the ship sinks.

Powers and abilities
 The original Clock King has no metahuman powers or abilities, although he is athletic and extraordinarily smart. He extensively uses clock and time -related gimmicks to devastating effect.
 The second Clock King is able to see several seconds into the future, allowing him to anticipate an opponent's every move. He is also a technological genius, creating devices such as teleporters, communications jamming equipment, and even an anti-gravity platform, all modelled after timepieces.

Other versions
Flashpoint
In an alternate timeline depicted in Flashpoint, the Clock King is imprisoned in military Doom prison before breaking out alongside Heat Wave and Plastic Man.

In other media
Television
Live-action

 The Clock King appears in the 1960s Batman TV series, portrayed by Walter Slezak. This version wears a black cape and a top-hat with a clock inside it. Furthermore, he wields weapons such as "Super Slick Watch Oil", "Knock Out Gas", and "Super Sonic Sound". In the consecutive episodes, "The Clock King's Crazy Crimes" and "The Clock King Gets Crowned", he disguises himself as a pop artist and tries to rob a time-related surrealist painting. Batman and Robin intervene, but are captured and stuffed into an oversized hourglass and left to be drowned in sand as the Clock King plots to filch Bruce Wayne's collection of antique pocket watches, only for the Dynamic Duo to escape the trap. Believing his enemies dead, the Clock King attempts to steal an atomic-powered Cesium clock, only to be foiled by the Dynamic Duo.
 The William Tockman incarnation of the Clock King appears in television series set in the Arrowverse, portrayed by Robert Knepper. 
 The character made his debut in the Arrow episode "Time of Death". Tockman masterminds the theft of a hacking device that can be used to break into bank vaults and computer systems to raise money for medical treatment for his dying sister, Beverly. He hacks into Felicity Smoak's computer system and disables it, leading to her getting involved in the Arrow's efforts to capture him and defeating Tockman herself.
 Tockman returns in The Flash episode "Power Outage". He is temporarily transferred to the Central City Police Department's custody before taking advantage of a citywide blackout to take everyone inside hostage. However, Iris West grabs Officer Eddie Thawne's gun beforehand and wounds Tockman with it before the Flash arrives to help.

Animation

 An original incarnation of the Clock King named Temple Fugate (a play on the Latin phrase "tempus fugit") appears in series set in the DC Animated Universe, voiced by Alan Rachins. This version is obsessed with time and punctuality, even going so far as to pre-plan his every waking moment on a to-do list broken down into precise blocks.
 Introduced in the Batman: The Animated Series episode "The Clock King", Fugate serves as the head of a time and motion study consulting company that was fined $20 million in court and was in the midst of appealing against it. Future Gotham mayor Hamilton Hill convinces Fugate to break his schedule and take his coffee break at a slightly later time, warning Fugate that the judge may consider his stress a sign of suspicious behavior. However, due to a string of bad luck, Fugate shows up late for his court appointment, loses his appeal, and goes bankrupt as a result. He later learns that Hill's firm represented the plaintiff for the case and swears revenge on Hill for making him late. Seven years later, Fugate becomes the Clock King and dedicates his life to destroying Hill. After publicly shaming him, Fugate has a confrontation with Batman and falls to his apparent death, only to return in the episode "Time Out of Joint", continuing to seek revenge against Hill using a stolen device that allows him to manipulate time. Nevertheless, Batman and Robin foil his plans and Fugate is sent to Arkham Asylum.
 Fugate returns in the Justice League Unlimited episode "Task Force X". Project Cadmus recruits him into the eponymous group to assist in a mission to steal the Annihilator automaton from the Justice League by acting as radio support and coordinating the mission's timing.
 The William Tockman incarnation of the Clock King appears in Batman: The Brave and the Bold, voiced by Dee Bradley Baker. This version possesses clock-themed weapons and gadgets, resembles the 1960s incarnation of the Clock King, and employs two henchmen named Tick and Tock. Additionally, an unnamed, heroic, alternate universe version of the Clock King makes a cameo appearance in the episode "Deep Cover for Batman!".
 An unidentified Clock King appears in Harley Quinn, voiced by James Adomian. Introduced in the episode "The 83rd Annual Villy Awards", this version is openly gay and in a relationship with the Riddler. In "Harley Quinn: A Very Problematic Valentine's Day Special", Clock King and Riddler get engaged.

Film
 The 1960s Batman TV series incarnation of the Clock King appears in Batman: Return of the Caped Crusaders.
 The William Tockman incarnation of the Clock King appears in The Lego Batman Movie.

Video games
 The William Tockman incarnation of the Clock King appears as a boss in Batman: The Brave and the Bold – The Videogame, voiced again by Dee Bradley Baker. In the Wii version, he is hired by Gentleman Ghost to lure Batman to London by capturing Hawkman and threatening to blow up Big Ben. In the Nintendo DS version, the Clock King and Morgaine le Fey join forces, but are defeated by Batman and Red Tornado.
 The William Tockman incarnation of the Clock King appears as a playable character in Lego DC Super-Villains, voiced again by Dee Bradley Baker.

Miscellaneous
 The 1960s Batman TV series incarnation of the Clock King appears in issue #4 of Batman '66, in which he is revealed to be Morris Tetch''', the brother of Jervis Tetch / Mad Hatter who created the latter's weapons. Additionally, Morris describes himself and Jervis as "meticulous obsessives", with the latter focusing on hats and the former clocks.
 The DCAU incarnation of the Clock King appears in an issue of The Batman Adventures, in which he succeeds in getting revenge on Hamilton Hill by rigging a mayoral election so the latter's opponent the Penguin can win.
 The William Tockman incarnation of the Clock King appears in an issue of the Batman: The Brave and the Bold tie-in comic book.
 An unidentified Clock King makes a cameo appearance in issue #8 of the Injustice: Gods Among Us prequel comic book.
 An unidentified Clock King appears in the Injustice 2'' prequel comic book as a member of the Suicide Squad until he is killed by Jason Todd disguised as a murderous Batman copycat.

Merchandise
In February 2009, Mattel released an action figure of the DCAU incarnation of the Clock King in the Justice League Unlimited toyline in a Matty Collector exclusive four pack along with Bane, Harley Quinn, and the Scarecrow.

References

External links
 ''The Unofficial Guide to the DC Universe'''s biography for the Clock King
 The ''DC Database'''s article on the Clock King's debut
 
 Stupid Villain Showcase Satirical analysis of the first Clock King by Seanbaby
 Clock King on the Batman: The Animated Series official page

Characters created by Lee Elias
Characters created by France Herron
Characters created by Sean McKeever
DC Comics male supervillains
DC Comics metahumans
Comics characters introduced in 1960
Comics characters introduced in 2008
DC Comics scientists
DC Comics television characters
DC Animated Universe characters
Batman characters
Suicide Squad members